WTBJ (91.3 FM) is a radio station broadcasting a Christian format. Licensed to Oxford, Alabama, United States, the station is currently owned by Trinity Christian Academy which is a ministry of Trinity Baptist Church whose current pastor is Dr. C. O. Grinstead. WTBJ broadcasts live on the internet using Shoutcast digital audio streaming. Top-of-the-hour news is licensed from USA Radio Network.

Simulcast
The station is simulcast on WTBB 89.9 FM in Gadsden, Alabama.

References

External links
WTBJ's official website
Trinity Christian Academy
Trinity Baptist Church
 
 
 

Moody Radio affiliate stations
Radio stations established in 1994
1994 establishments in Alabama
TBJ
Oxford, Alabama
Baptist Christianity in Alabama